Pachybathron tayrona is a species of sea snail, a marine gastropod mollusk, in the family Cystiscidae.

References

tayrona
Gastropods described in 1987
Cystiscidae